WKRI-LP is a Classic Hits, Classic Top 40 and Oldies formatted broadcast radio station licensed to and serving Richmond, Kentucky.  WKRI-LP is owned and operated by RichmondRadio, Inc.

References

External links
 FM95.9 WKRI Online
 

2016 establishments in Kentucky
Classic hits radio stations in the United States
Oldies radio stations in the United States
Radio stations established in 2016
KRI-LP
KRI-LP
Richmond, Kentucky